Leah Christine Pruett (formerly Leah Pritchett, born May 26, 1988) is an American drag racer, currently driving an NHRA Top Fuel dragster for Tony Stewart Racing.

Racing career
Pruett debuted in Top Fuel in 2013 with Dote Racing after previously competing in Pro Mod and Nostalgia Funny Car. Her first career national event win on the professional level came February 28, 2016 at the Carquest Auto Parts NHRA Nationals in Chandler, Arizona, defeating Brittany Force in the first all-female final round in Top Fuel since 1982. She finished seventh in points in 2016 with one win, fifth in 2017 with four wins, and fourth in 2018 (two wins), 2019 (one win) and 2020 (no wins). In 2021, she claimed one win.

On October 14, 2021, Pruett was announced as the Top Fuel driver for Tony Stewart Racing in 2022.

Personal life
Pruett was first married to Todd LeDuc, off-road racer and Monster Jam truck driver. She met Gary Pritchett, a crew member for NHRA Top Fuel drag racer Steve Torrence, in 2011; they married in 2013. Pruett filed for divorce from Pritchett on July 31, 2019, in Hendricks County, Indiana. She was arrested on a charge of disorderly conduct in Hendricks County, Indiana, on October 21, 2012; the terms of a pre-trial conversion agreement were met on February 7, 2014. She and former NASCAR driver Tony Stewart announced their engagement through simultaneous Instagram posts on each of their accounts on March 18, 2021. They married on November 21, 2021 in Los Cabos, Mexico.

She is not related to former stock car racing, open-wheel racing and sports car racing driver Scott Pruett.

Career highlights
 Claimed the NHRA SAMTech Factory Stock Showdown championship in 2019, DSR's first series championship in their first year in the class. Pruett is also the only female champion in the short history of the class.
 Pruett also won the 2010 Nostalgia Funny Car title in the NHRA Hot Rod Heritage Series
 Has earned 12 total event wins (9 in Top Fuel, 3 in Pro Modified)
 Has a career best E.T. of 3.631 seconds, and a best speed of 334.15 miles per hour

References

External links
Leah Pruett official website
Don Schumacher Racing

Living people
American racing drivers
Female dragster drivers
Dragster drivers
Racing drivers' wives and girlfriends
1988 births